The 1975 Nevada Wolf Pack football team represented the University of Nevada, Reno during the 1975 NCAA Division II football season. Nevada competed as an independent. The Wolf Pack were led by seventh-year head coach Jerry Scattini, who was fired after the end of the season. They played their home games at Mackay Stadium.

Schedule

References

Nevada
Nevada Wolf Pack football seasons
Nevada Wolf Pack football